Interstate 2 may refer to any of four unconnected Interstate Highways in the United States:

 Interstate 2 in Texas
 Interstate A-2 in Alaska
 Interstate H-2 in Hawaii
 Interstate PRI-2 in Puerto Rico

2